La Terrasse-sur-Dorlay is a commune in the Loire department in central France.

La Terrasse-sur-Dorlay takes its name from the Dorlay river, a tributary of the Gier, which flows through the commune.

Population

Sights

References

See also
Communes of the Loire department

Communes of Loire (department)